Hammersmith power station supplied electricity to the London Borough of Hammersmith from 1897 to 1965. It was owned and operated by the Vestry / Borough of Hammersmith until the nationalisation of the British electricity supply industry in 1948.  The power station was frequently redeveloped with new plant over its operational life to meet increased demands for electricity. It was decommissioned in 1965.

History
In 1893 the Vestry (parish council) of Hammersmith applied for a Provisional Order under the Electric Lighting Acts to generate and supply electricity to the parish. This was granted by the Board of Trade and was confirmed by Parliament through the Electric Lighting Orders Confirmation (No.3) Act 1893 (56 & 57 Vict. c. xl). The power station was built off Fulham Palace Road, north of Yeldham Road (51°29'24"N 0°13'18"W) and first supplied electricity on 21 June 1897 to a potential population of 104,000 (1898).

Equipment specification
The original 1898 plant at Hammersmith power station comprised Bellis and McClaren engines directly coupled to Ferranti flywheel disc alternators. The generating capacity and maximum connected load increased as shown:

Inter-war plant
Following the First World War further new plant was installed to meet growing demand for electricity. By 1923 the generating plant comprised:

 Coal-fired boilers generating up to 190,000 lb/h (23.9 kg/s) of steam, these supplied steam to:
 Generators
 1 × 1,500 kW steam turbo-alternator
 2 × 2,000 kW steam turbo-alternators
 1 × 3,000 kW steam turbo-alternator
 1 × 10,000 kW steam turbo-alternator

These machines gave a total generating capacity of 18,500 kW of alternating current.

The plant installed in 1919 included the UK's first large pulverised fuel fired boilers, these were provided on three of the units used a bin feed system. Hydraulic coal delivery was also introduced at Hammersmith.

A choice of electricity supplies were available to consumers:

 2-phase, 50 Hz AC at 110 and 220 Volts
 3-phase, 50 Hz AC at 110 and 220 Volts.

New plant 1937
In 1937 the generating capacity of the station was 28,500 kW, the maximum load was 23,850 kW, and the connections on the system were 69.822 MW.

By 1954 the plant comprised:

 Boilers:
 1 × 17,000 lb/h (2.1 kg/s) Stirling boilers with chain grate stoker,
 2 × 20,000 lb/h (2.5 kg/s) Stirling boilers with chain grate stokers,
 1 × 37,000 lb/h (4.7 kg/s) Stirling boilers with chain grate stoker,
 3 × 45,000 lb/h (5.7 kg/s) Stirling boilers with chain grate stokers,

The total evaporative capacity was 229,000 lb/h (28.8 kg/s), steam conditions were 200 psi and 620–650 °F (13.8 bar, 327–343 °C), and supplied steam to:

 Turbo-alternators:
 2 × Parsons 10 MW turbo-alternators, 3000 rpm, generating at 6.6 kV

Condenser cooling water was taken from the River Thames.

Operations
Operational data for the early years of operation was as follows:

There was a growth in the number of consumers and the amount of current sold within yearly variations.

Operating data 1921–23
The operating data for the period 1921–23 is shown in the table:

Under the terms of the Electricity (Supply) Act 1926 (16-17 Geo. 5 c. 51) the Central Electricity Board (CEB) was established in 1926. The CEB identified high efficiency ‘selected’ power stations that would supply electricity most effectively. The CEB also constructed the national grid (1927–33) to connect power stations within a region. Hammersmith power station was electrically connected to Fulham power station via twin 66 kV underground cables and to Barnes power station via triple 6.6 kV underground lines.

Operating data 1937 and 1946
Hammersmith power station operating data, 1937 and 1946 is as follows.

The British electricity supply industry was nationalised in 1948 under the provisions of the Electricity Act 1947 (10-11 Geo. 6 c. 54). The Hammersmith electricity undertaking was abolished, ownership of Hammersmith power station was vested in the British Electricity Authority, and subsequently the Central Electricity Authority and the Central Electricity Generating Board (CEGB). At the same time the electricity distribution and sales responsibilities of the Hammersmith electricity undertaking were transferred to the London Electricity Board (LEB).

Operating data 1954–65
Operating data for the period 1954–65 is shown in the table:

The data demonstrates the less intensive use of the power station during its last decade of operating life.

The electricity supplied, in MWh, by Hammersmith power station over its operating life was:

Closure
Hammersmith power station was decommissioned in 1965. The buildings subsequently demolished and the area has been redeveloped with commercial and residential buildings.

See also
 Timeline of the UK electricity supply industry
 List of power stations in England

References

Coal-fired power stations in England
Demolished power stations in the United Kingdom
Former power stations in England
Power stations on the River Thames
Former power stations in London